Ertuğ is a Turkish surname and male given name. It may refer to:

Ahmet Ertuğ (born 1949), Turkish photographer 
Ertuğ Ergin (1970–2012), Turkish musician
Ismail Ertug (born 1975), German politician
Osman Ertuğ (born 1949), Northern Cypriot diplomat

See also
Ertuğrul (disambiguation)

Turkish-language surnames
Turkish masculine given names